The 1994 Pennsylvania gubernatorial election was held on November 8, 1994. The incumbent governor, Bob Casey, Sr. (Democrat), was barred from seeking a third term by the state constitution. The Republican Party nominated Congressman Tom Ridge, while the Democrats nominated Mark Singel, Casey's lieutenant governor. Ridge went on to win the race with 45% of the vote. Singel finished with 39%, and Constitution Party candidate Peg Luksik finished third, garnering 12% of the vote.

Democratic primary

Candidates
Catherine Baker Knoll, Pennsylvania Treasurer (from Allegheny County)
Dwight Evans, State Representative (from Philadelphia)
Bob O'Donnell, State Representative and former Speaker of the House (from Philadelphia) 
Mark Singel, Lieutenant Governor (from Cambria County)
Phillip Valenti, LaRouche activist (from Chester County)
Chuck Volpe, insurance executive (from Allegheny County) 
Lynn Yeakel, philanthropist and 1992 nominee for U.S. Senate (from Montgomery County)

Campaign
Lt. Governor Singel was a well-known figure in the state and was a clear early frontrunner after serving six months as acting governor as Bob Casey underwent cancer treatments. However, his 1992 defeat by Lynn Yeakel in the 1992 Democratic primary for senate left the party feeling that Singel was vulnerable in a statewide election. Treasurer Catherine Baker Knoll, who was popular with older voters and siphoned the support of some labor groups from Singel, was viewed as his biggest threat, but state representative Dwight Evans, who mobilized urban minority voters, finished a somewhat surprising second. Former state Speaker of the House Bob O'Donnell and Yeakel, who was criticized for campaigning poorly in the close 1992 senate race, both saw their campaigns fail to get traction.

Results

Republican primary

Candidates
Sam Katz, political consultant (from Philadelphia)
Mike Fisher, state senator and 1986 lieutenant governor nominee (from Allegheny County)
Jack Perry
Ernie Preate, Pennsylvania Attorney General (from Lackawanna County)
Tom Ridge, U.S. Representative from Erie (from Erie County)

Campaign
Attorney General Ernie Preate, who was known for both being a tough prosecutor and working to reform the mental health system, was seen as the initial frontrunner, but his attempt was marred by a corruption controversy. Mike Fisher, a state senator and former candidate for lieutenant governor, sought to take advantage of Preate's missteps but was unable gain a majority of establishment support. Tom Ridge, who Republicans had initially tried to court to run in the 1990 election, slowly built name recognition and gained political backing due to his relatively moderate track record.

Results

General election

Candidates
Patrick Fallon (Libertarian)
Vince Hatton
Tom Holloway (Reform)
Mark Freeman
Peg Luksik, director of an anti-abortion organization (Constitution)
running mate: Jim Clymer, attorney
Mark Singel, Lt. Governor (Democratic)
running mate: Tom Foley, Pennsylvania Secretary of Labor and Industry
Tom Ridge, U.S. Representative  from Erie (Republican)
running mate: Mark Schweiker, Bucks County Commissioner

Campaign
Prior to the election, Singel appeared to be a candidate who would be difficult to beat; he had gained wide name recognition and a positive job appraisal for his service as acting governor during Bob Casey's battle with serious illness. In contrast, Ridge had been a relatively obscure Congressman who was mostly unknown outside of his Erie base. Ridge proved to be a successful fundraiser and undercut support from Democrats in the socially liberal but fiscally conservative suburbs of Philadelphia and Pittsburgh.

Abortion became a key issue in the campaign. Peg Luksik ran a strong third party campaign in opposition to the Republican nominations of the pro-choice Ridge and Barbara Hafer in their most recent two gubernatorial campaigns. Singel, who is also pro-choice, gained only lukewarm support from his former boss Casey, a vocal critic of abortion policy.

The tide began to turn against Singel after the revelation that he had voted to parole an individual named Reginald McFadden, who would later be charged for a series of murders in New York City. Ridge, whose campaign emphasized his "tough on crime" stance, took advantage of this situation, much in the manner that George H. W. Bush had used the Willie Horton incident against Michael Dukakis. Singel was further undercut by a lack of Democratic enthusiasm; turnout was particularly low in strongholds such as Philadelphia, Pittsburgh, and Scranton.

Polling

Results

References 

 

Pennsylvania
Gubernatorial
1994